John Jordan is a Canadian politician, who was elected to the Legislative Assembly of Ontario in the 2022 provincial election. He represents the riding of Lanark—Frontenac—Kingston as a member of the Progressive Conservative Party of Ontario.

Jordan is the son of former MPP Leo Jordan.

References 

Living people
Progressive Conservative Party of Ontario MPPs
21st-century Canadian politicians
People from Lanark County
Year of birth missing (living people)